Pilhill Brook is a  tributary of the River Anton in Hampshire, England. It is a chalk stream, known for its trout fishing.

Toponymy
The brook is believed to have been called the Ann, or Anna.  The name  is found in the Close Rolls in 1228.

Course
The brook rises near Fyfield and passes Thruxton before flowing through Anna Valley past the villages of Abbotts Ann, Little Ann and Amport, joining the River Anton near Upper Clatford, which flows in turn into the River Test.

Industry
in 1813, the brothers, Robert and William Tasker, set up the Waterloo Ironworks in the Anna Valley at Upper Clatford, using a waterwheel driven by the brook to power the forge. They specialised in making agricultural equipment, progressing to the manufacture of steam traction engines from 1865. There were four conventional watermills on the brook, Upper Mill at Monxton, Upper Mill at Abbots Ann, Abbots Ann Mill and Sarsons Mill at Amport.

Water quality
The Environment Agency measures water quality of the river systems in England. Each is given an overall ecological status, which may be one of five levels: high, good, moderate, poor and bad. There are several components that are used to determine this, including biological status, which looks at the quantity and varieties of invertebrates, angiosperms and fish. Chemical status, which compares the concentrations of various chemicals against known safe concentrations, is rated good or fail.

Water quality of the Pillhill Brook in 2019:

In 2021 there was concern about water quality. "Villages protest Southern Water Pillhill Brook sewage"

See also
List of rivers of England

References

External links
Catchment map

Rivers of Hampshire
Test catchment